Acanthograeffea is a genus of stick insect.

References

External links
 species Acanthograeffea Günther, 1932 Phasmida Species File Online

Phasmatidae
Phasmatodea genera